Year 332 (CCCXXXII) was a leap year starting on Saturday (link will display the full calendar) of the Julian calendar. At the time, it was known as the Year of the Consulship of Pacatianus and Hilarianus (or, less frequently, year 1085 Ab urbe condita). The denomination 332 for this year has been used since the early medieval period, when the Anno Domini calendar era became the prevalent method in Europe for naming years.

Events 
<onlyinclude>

By place

Roman Empire 
 Emperor Constantine I and his son Constantine II, aged 16, defeat the Goths in Moesia. The Goths become Roman allies and protect the Danube frontier.
 Constantine I continues construction of a bridge (in imitation of Trajan and his architect Apollodorus of Damascus) across the Danube, for forward-staging grounds for planned campaigns against local tribes.
 May 18 – Constantine I announces a free distribution of food to the citizens in Constantinople, similar to the food given out in the city of Rome. The amount is approximately 80,000 rations a day, doled out from 117 distribution points around the city.

Births 
 Saint Monica, Christian saint and mother of Augustine of Hippo (d. 387)

Deaths 
 Basilina, wife of Julius Constantius and the mother of Roman Emperor Julian

References